The Bassett Family House (also known as the Dielytra Arbor House) is a historic house located at 2399 Main Street in Mt. Vision, Otsego County, New York.

Description and history 
It was built in 1844, and is a two-story residence with a heavy timber, post and beam frame and wooden clapboard siding, set on a cut-stone foundation and surmounted by a gabled roof. A series of additions and modifications took place in the 1860s and 1870s. The interior features a number of Greek Revival details. Also on the property is a barn and two chicken houses.

It was listed on the National Register of Historic Places on August 11, 2004.

References

Houses on the National Register of Historic Places in New York (state)
Houses completed in 1844
Houses in Otsego County, New York
National Register of Historic Places in Otsego County, New York